Cinergy Corp. was an energy company based in Cincinnati, Ohio, United States, from 1994 to 2006. Its name is a play on the words "synergy", "energy", and "Cincinnati".

History
Cinergy was created on October 24, 1994, from the merger of the Cincinnati Gas & Electric Company (CG&E) and Kentucky subsidiary Union Light, Heat & Power (ULH&P) with Plainfield, Indiana–based PSI Energy (Public Service Indiana).

In 1996, Riverfront Stadium in Downtown Cincinnati was renamed Cinergy Field in a sponsorship deal with Cinergy. The stadium was demolished by implosion in December 2002 to make way for Great American Ball Park.

In 2005, Cinergy announced a friendly acquisition by the larger Charlotte, North Carolina–based Duke Energy. The acquisition was completed on April 3, 2006. The combined company retains the Duke Energy name. Until the acquisition, Cinergy still operated under the names of the three local utilities (e.g., Cinergy/CG&E in Cincinnati); since the acquisition, the names of the three former Cinergy utilities and Duke Power, the former Duke Energy utility subsidiary, have been phased out, although signs bearing the former logos still remain at some substations.

Environmental record
In May 2006, Cinergy was fingered as a key contributor to major pollution in the American Midwest, prompting the New York State government to sue the company and forcing the company to install modern pollution control equipment. The Ontario government, across the border in Canada, followed suit at the request of New York Attorney General Eliot Spitzer.

Researchers at the University of Massachusetts Amherst have identified Cinergy as the 49th-largest corporate producer of air pollution in the United States, with roughly 29 million pounds of toxic chemicals released annually into the air. Major pollutants indicated by the study include sulfuric acid, hydrochloric acid, chromium compounds, and manganese compounds.

Holiday model train display

Under its various operating names, the company operated a holiday model train display that has attracted over 9 million visitors since the event's inception in 1946.

Duke, in partnership with railway company CSX, continued to host the annual train display in Cinergy's former headquarters until 2011, when the display was donated to the Cincinnati Museum Center at Union Terminal.

References

External links
 Cinergy is now Duke Energy
 Merger Information
  – signage and logo information prior to the merger

Companies disestablished in 2006
Defunct companies based in Cincinnati
Duke Energy
Electric power companies of the United States
Energy companies established in 1994